Donenfeld is a surname. Notable people with the surname include:

 Friedrich Donenfeld (1912–1976), Austrian footballer and manager
 Harry Donenfeld (1893–1965), American comic book publisher
 Irwin Donenfeld (1926–2004), American comic book publisher, son of Harry